The Clara Barkley Dorr House is an historic home in Pensacola, Florida. Built in 1871, it is located at 311 South Adams Street. On July 24, 1974, it was added to the U.S. National Register of Historic Places for its classical revival architecture.

In 1989, the house was listed in A Guide to Florida's Historic Architecture, published by the University of Florida Press.

The house is part of Historic Pensacola Village and is now a Victorian period museum house open to the public.

History 
Clara Barkley married Eben Walker Dorr in 1849. The couple lived in Bagdad, Florida where Eben worked for a lumber company. In 1870, Eben died. Clara had the house built in 1871 in Pensacola to accommodate her and her five children.

By the 1960s, the house was in poor condition. The Pensacola Heritage Foundation bought the building in 1965, restored it, and opened access to the public.

References

External links
 Escambia County listings at National Register of Historic Places
 Dorr House at National Society of The Colonial Dames of America
 Dorr House photo gallery - Historic Pensacola Village

Houses on the National Register of Historic Places in Florida
Buildings and structures in Pensacola, Florida
National Register of Historic Places in Escambia County, Florida
Historic Pensacola Village
Historic house museums in Florida
Museums in Pensacola, Florida
Houses in Escambia County, Florida
Houses completed in 1871
National Society of the Colonial Dames of America